Lomax is a surname. Notable people and characters with the surname include:
 Alan Lomax (1915–2002), American musicologist, son of John Avery Lomax 
 Bess Lomax Hawes (1921–2009), American folklorist and folk musician, sister of Alan
 Cathy Lomax, London artist
 David Lomax (1938–2014), British television reporter 
 David Lomax (born 1970), New Zealand rugby league footballer
 Eric Lomax (1919–2012), British Army officer, author of The Railway Man
 Geoff Lomax (1925–1992), English cricketer
 Ian Lomax (1931–1996), English cricketer and racehorse trainer
 Jane Lomax-Smith (born 1950), Australian politician
 Jackie Lomax (1944–2013), English singer-songwriter and guitarist
 Jerrold E. Lomax (1927–2014), American architect
 John Lomax (1867–1948), American musicologist and folklorist, journalist, writer, and band manager
 John Lomax (rugby league) (born 1966), a New Zealand rugby player
John Lomax III (born 1944), American country music journalist, music distributor and manager
 Judith Lomax (1774–1828), American poet and religious writer
 Kelvin Lomax (born 1986), English footballer
 Lunsford L. Lomax (1835–1913), American Civil War general
 Michael Lomax (born 1947), American educator and philanthropist
 Michael Trappes-Lomax (1900–1972), English poet, soldier, and historian
 Neil Lomax (born 1959), American football quarterback 
 Rachel Lomax (born 1945), British economist and former government official
 Ruby Terrill Lomax (1886–1961), American musicologist and wife of John Avery Lomax
 Samuel Lomax (1855–1915), British First World War general
 Scott Lomax (born 1982), writer and justice campaigner
 Vernon Lomax Smith, American professor of business economics and law, Nobel laureate
 Walter P. Lomax Jr. (1932–2013), American physician and entrepreneur
Fictional characters
 Peri Lomax, in Hollyoaks
 Byron Lomax, alien in human form in The Outer Limits  episode O.B.I.T.
 Kevin Lomax, protagonist in the film The Devil's Advocate
 Bernie Lomax, antagonist in the film Weekend at Bernie's
 Hollis Lomax, Williams Stoner's nemesis in the novel Stoner by John Williams
 Lomax, Joseph William and Rob, in the 1998 film Mercury Rising
 Lomax the Sublibrarian for the London Library in the Sherlock Holmes story "The Adventure of the Illustrious Client"
 Oscar Lomax, blind millionaire from Ilkley in the TV Series Psychoville
 Vera Lomax, daughter of Coronation Street character Ena Sharples
 Dottie Lomax, in "The Adventure of the Wary Witness," an episode of the 1970s television series Ellery Queen
 Mrs. Lomax, the school librarian in The Map Trap by Andrew Clements
Lomax (no first name given), played by Kirk Douglas in the film The War Wagon
Eddie Lomax, played by Gary Busey in the 1993 film The Firm
Freddy Lomax, played by Jake Busey in Season 4 of the television series Mr. Robot
Lomax (no first name given), played by Benedict Wong in the film Annihilation

See also
 Lomas (surname)
Loomis (surname)

English toponymic surnames